Trans-Asia Shipping Lines, Incorporated (TASLI) is a shipping company based in Cebu City, Philippines. It was incorporated on March 25, 1974, under the name of Solar Shipping Lines, Inc. The Chairman  of the company is Dennis A. Uy. Trans-Asia Shipping Lines is now managed by the Chelsea Logistics, Corp.

The company took steps towards cargo modernization in 2013, by acquiring almost 8,000 square meters of property within Cebu Pier area, and upgrading operations to include 10-footer container vans while maintaining loose and palletized / break bulk operations to cater to clients' varying needs. By 2015, the company started offering 20-foot container van service for Cebu to Cagayan and Cagayan to Cebu route.

In 2016, the company expanded cargo operations to Manila, with a freighter vessel offering Less Container Cargo (LCL) and Full Container Load (FCL) cargo service. Barely 6 months of serving Cebu to Manila and Manila to Cebu route, we now include 40-footer container service.

In December 2016, Chelsea Logistics Holdings Corporation purchased the entire outstanding shares of stocks of Trans-Asia Shipping Lines, Inc. including its four subsidiaries.
 Quality Metal & Shipworks, Inc. – engaged in machining and mechanical works on ship machineries and industrial plants.
 Oceanstar Shipping, Inc. – engaged in the business of domestic shipping for the transportation of passengers and cargoes within territorial waters and/or on the high seas.
 Dynamic Cuisine, Inc. – engaged in operating restaurants, coffee shops, refreshment parlors, cocktail lounges, bars, and in cooking and catering foods, drinks, refreshments and other foods or commodities.
 Starsy Shoppe, Inc. – engaged in the purchase of all kinds of food and beverage products and merchandise, except rice and corn, locally and/or through importation for purposes of selling the same on retail or wholesale, either local and/or through importation.

Current fleet 

 

 
TASLI operates 9 passenger-cargo vessels and 6 cargo vessels. Its latest vessel is Warrior Spirit, renamed as Trans-Asia 1, which was acquired in late 2016 and to serves the Cebu-Cagayan-Cebu route. In December 2016, West Ocean 11 arrived in the Philippines and is scheduled to be delivered to TASLI after completion of its dry-docking in mid- 2017.

Passenger vessels (9 Ships)

M/V Trans-Asia 1 (3rd Gen Passenger vessel) (New Flagship) 
M/V Trans-Asia 1 the new flagship vessel of Trans-Asia Shipping Lines, Inc. formerly Warrior Spirit. It was acquired by the company in late 2016. She now serves Cebu to Cagayan de Oro route.

Last July 10, 2019 she was caught fire while under repair at FF Cruz Wharf, Pier 8, Mandaue City, Cebu around 4AM  One of the 36 crew got minor injuries the incident is still under investigation.

She was built by Ateliers et Chantiers du Havre in their Le Havre yard in France. She was completed in 1980.

She was also the secondary subject of the infamous "Tayog-Tayog" ghost ship, along with M/V Filipinas Iligan of CSLI, which traverse the Ozamis-Cebu route, but in her opposite schedule which was appeared every night around midnight in the vicinity of Lazi, Siquijor.

M/V Trans-Asia 2 
M/V Trans-Asia 2, formerly Lite Ferry I of Lite Shipping was acquired by Trans-Asia Shipping Lines, Inc. in 1998 and renamed as Trans-Asia 2. She serves Cebu to Ozamiz route.

M/V Trans-Asia 3 (Former Flagship) 
M/V Trans-Asia 3 the formerly flagship vessel of Trans-Asia Shipping Lines, Inc. Formerly New Shikoku of Shikoku Ferry Line of Japan, it was acquired by the company in 2008. This passenger vessel has a length of 110 meters and can travel up to 20 knots. It serves Cebu to Ozamiz, Cebu to Iloilo, and Cebu to Masbate route.

M/V Trans-Asia 8 
Trans-Asia acquired this ship in early 2011. This ship used to be Doña Rita Sr. of Gothong Southern. She serves Cebu-Iloilo-Cebu and Cebu-Iligan-Cebu routes.

M/V Trans-Asia 10 
MV Trans-Asia 10 is the former M/V Princess of the Earth of Sulpicio Lines which is now Philippine Span Asia Carrier Corporation. She currently serves the Cebu-Cagayan de Oro and Cebu-Ozamis route.

M/V Trans-Asia 18 
Acquired in Japan, Ex-Sakura of Uwajima Transport Ferry. She currently serves the Cebu-Cagayan de Oro route.

M/V Trans-Asia 19 
A newly built RORO/Passenger vessel from Kegoya Dock in Japan.
She's now serving the Tagbilaran-Cagayan & Tagbilaran to Cebu route.

M/V Trans-Asia 21() 
A brand new 123 meter Bed/Seat RORO/Passenger ferry, built at Fukuoka Shipbuilding in Japan and has a capacity 1,085 passengers; she replaced MV Trans-Asia 20 on the Cebu - Cagayan Do Oro route.

M/V Asia Philippines 
M/V Asia Philippines was acquired by Trans-Asia in 1994 from Japan. She was built by Nakamura Zosen in their Matsue yard in Japan in 1975, then named as the M/V Orange Star. She was the sister ship of Danica Joy 2 of Aleson Shipping Lines.
She serves Cebu-Iloilo-Cebu and Cebu-Iligan-Cebu routes.

Cargo vessels (5 ships)

M/V Asia Pacific 
M/V Asia Pacific was acquired by Trans-Asia in 1997. She plies the routes Cebu to Tacloban and Cebu to Zamboanga.

M/V Trans-Asia 12 
M/V Trans-Asia 12 was acquired in 2016. She has a capacity of 175  twenty-foot equivalent units (TEU) and she serves the Cebu-Manila route

M/V Trans-Asia 15

M/V Trans-Asia 16

M/V Trans-Asia 17

Former vessels

M/V Trans-Asia 20 ( IMO number: 9858369) 
A brand new 98 meter RORO/Passenger ferry built at Kegoya Dock in Japan, she was designed to carry 690 passengers and was assigned on Cebu to Cagayan de Oro route. In 2021, she left Trans-Asia fleet and was transferred to its sister company, Starlite Ferries and renamed as MV Starlite Phoenix.

M/V Trans-Asia 5 (Former Flagship) 
M/V Trans-Asia 5, former Butuan Bay 1 of Carlos A. Gothong Lines Inc. (CAGLI). Trans-Asia acquired this ship in the early 2010 and completed reconfiguring the vessel in December 2010 and she serves Cebu to Masbate route as a cargo vessel. Her passenger decks were removed due to Permit Cancellation.

She was built by Iwagi Zosen in the Iwagi shipyard for the shipping company Keiyo Kisen and she was completed in February 1989.

M/V Trans-Asia 9 
Trans-Asia acquired this ship in early 2012. This ship was the Ferry Kikai of A" Line in Japan, Mabuhay 6 of WG&A Shipping Lines, Our Lady of Good Voyage of Cebu Ferries (later 2Go Travel) and Doña Conchita Sr. of Gothong Southern. She is currently being scrapped in TASLI Wharf at FF.Cruz Mandaue City

M/V Asia China 

The vessel ended its service last February 2013 and sold to Breakers and was scrapped in Cebu shipyard.

M/V Trans-Asia  

M/V Trans-Asia was owned by the Sado Kisen Car Ferry of Japan, and was acquired by Trans-Asia/Solar in 1993.  M/V Trans-Asia's sister ship is M/V Asia China. The vessel was broken down in Navotas

M/V Asia Malaysia

M/V Asia Malaysia was acquired by Trans-Asia in 1997 and used to serve Cebu City to Iloilo City route. She sank off the coast of Ajuy, Iloilo in 2011. 
134 passengers and 44 crewmembers on board was bound for Iloilo from Cebu when it sank.

All 178 people on board were rescued by fishermen and other passing vessels like the MV Filipinas Cebu and MV Phil Visayas, assisted by the PCG.

M/V Asia Japan 

M/V Asia Japan sold to Santa Clara Shipping and renamed as M/V Nathan Matthew

M/V Asia South Korea 

M/V Asia South Korea was acquired by the company in 1972 and also was used to serve Cebu City to Iloilo City route. She ran aground and sank off Bantayan Island in Cebu on December 22, 1999, due to stormy weather and high seas, killing 56 of its passengers.

M/V Asia Hongkong 

This vessel was sold to Montenegro Lines and renamed as M/V Reina del Rosario

M/V Asia Brunei 

Asia Brunei was sold to Navios Lines as M/V Grand Unity.

M/V Asia Singapore 

Asia Singapore was sold to FJ Palacio Lines and renamed as M/V Calbayog. M/V Calbayog was sold to Starlite Ferries Inc. and renamed as M/V Starlite Neptune.

M/V Asia Thailand 

This vessel was destroyed by fire while docked at the Port of Cebu.

M/V Asia Taiwan 

The vessel was sold to Asian Marine Transport System and renamed as M/V Super Shuttle Ferry 7 then capsized in Manila Bay.

M/V Asia Indonesia 

The vessel was sold to Navios Lines as M/V Grand Venture.

Ports of call 
With Cebu as the company's home port, it serves other destinations such as:

Passenger/cargo:

 Cagayan de Oro
 Iloilo
 Masbate
 Ozamiz
 Tagbilaran
 Iligan

Cargo:

 Tacloban
 Zamboanga
 Manila
 Davao

Routes

Passenger/cargo routes 
Cebu – Cagayan de Oro – Trans-Asia 18/Trans-Asia 20
Cagayan de Oro – Cebu – Trans-Asia 18/Trans-Asia 20
Cebu – Ozamiz – Trans-Asia 2/Trans Asia 3/Trans-Asia 10
Ozamiz – Cebu – Trans-Asia 2/Trans Asia 3/Trans-Asia 10
Cebu – Iligan – Trans-Asia 8/Asia Philippines
Iligan – Cebu – Trans Asia 8/Asia Philippines
Cebu – Iloilo – Asia Philippines/Trans-Asia 8
Iloilo – Cebu – Asia Philippines/Trans-Asia 8
Cebu – Masbate – Trans Asia 3/Trans-Asia 10
Masbate – Cebu – Trans Asia 3/Trans-Asia 10
Cebu – Tagbilaran – Trans-Asia 19
Tagbilaran – Cebu – Trans-Asia 19
Tagbilaran – Cagayan de Oro – Trans-Asia 19
Cagayan de Oro – Tagbilaran – Trans-Asia 19
Tagbilaran – Iligan – Asia Philippines.

Cargo-only routes 
Zamboanga – Cebu – Asia Pacific
Cebu – Zamboanga – Asia Pacific
Tacloban – Cebu – Asia Pacific
Cebu – Tacloban – Asia Pacific
Cebu – Manila – Trans-Asia 12

See also 
 SuperFerry
 Montenegro Lines
 Cebu Ferries
 Negros Navigation
 Sulpicio Lines
 Supercat Fast Ferry Corporation
 Roble Shipping Inc.
 List of shipping companies in the Philippines

References

Shipping companies of the Philippines
Companies based in Cebu City
Ferry companies of the Philippines
Transport companies established in 1974
Philippine brands
Philippine companies established in 1974